Federico Gozi was Captain Regent of San Marino from October 1629 to March 1630 and again in 1634 from April to September.

In 1629 he served with Orazio Belluzzi and in 1634 he served with Lattanzio Valli.

Year of birth missing
Year of death missing
Captains Regent of San Marino
Members of the Grand and General Council